Paulo Ricardo Kobayashi (born 9 January 1970), known as Paulinho Kobayashi, is a Brazilian football manager and former player who played as a forward. He is the current head coach of Ferroviário.

Kobayashi began his career with Associação Desportiva São Caetano. He played for Portuguesa, Santos, Vitória and América-RN in the Campeonato Brasileiro Série A. He also spent three seasons with Ionikos and one season with Panachaiki in the Greek Super League.

Honours

Player 
 São Caetano
 Campeonato Paulista Série A3: 1991

 América de Natal
 Copa do Nordeste: 1998

Manager 
Altos
 Campeonato Piauiense: 2017, 2018

References

External links

1970 births
Living people
Brazilian footballers
Brazilian football managers
Brazilian expatriate footballers
Expatriate footballers in Greece
Brazilian people of Japanese descent
Association football defenders
Campeonato Brasileiro Série A players
Campeonato Brasileiro Série B players
Super League Greece players
Campeonato Brasileiro Série C managers
Campeonato Brasileiro Série D managers
Associação Desportiva São Caetano players
Associação Portuguesa de Desportos players
Santos FC players
Club Athletico Paranaense players
Rio Branco Esporte Clube players
Esporte Clube Vitória players
Sociedade Esportiva e Recreativa Caxias do Sul players
Associação Atlética Ponte Preta players
Associação Atlética Portuguesa (Santos) players
Atlético Clube Goianiense players
América Futebol Clube (RN) players
Ceará Sporting Club players
Iraklis Thessaloniki F.C. players
Panachaiki F.C. players
Atromitos F.C. players
Ionikos F.C. players
Villa Nova Atlético Clube players
União São João Esporte Clube players
Vila Nova Futebol Clube players
Mineiros Esporte Clube players
Clube Recreativo e Atlético Catalano players
Brasiliense Futebol Clube players
Guaratinguetá Futebol players
Clube Atlético Bragantino players
Associação Atlética Portuguesa (Santos) managers
Associação Atlética Francana managers
Clube Atlético Taquaritinga managers
Villa Nova Atlético Clube managers
Associação Atlética de Altos managers
Floresta Esporte Clube managers
Sociedade Imperatriz de Desportos managers
Ferroviário Atlético Clube (CE) managers
People from Osasco
Footballers from São Paulo (state)
Moto Club de São Luís managers